Albert Alekseyevich Shesternyov (20 June 1941 – 5 November 1994) was a football player for CSKA Moscow and the Soviet Union. He is generally regarded as the best football defender in Soviet football history.

Shesternyov was born and died in Moscow. Nicknamed "Ivan the Terrible", he was the captain of the great Soviet team of the 1960s, he earned 90 caps an appearance record only broken subsequently by Oleg Blokhin and Rinat Dasaev in the late 1980s.

An international from 1961 to 1971, the CSKA Moscow libero played and represented his country at three FIFA World Cups and two European Championships: 1964 European Nations' Cup and the UEFA Euro 1968. During the latter tournament the Soviet team faced Italy in one of the semi-finals. The game finished in a 0–0 tie, (including extra time), and according to the rules at the time the winner was to be decided by a coin toss. The Soviet side were given the opportunity to call the coin, and as captain Shesternyov called it. He called it incorrectly and they were out of the final. They finished in 4th place, after losing to England in the Third place play-off game. Shesternyov was captain of the Soviet national team for 62 of his 90 caps.

He was CSKA Moscow's youngest ever debutant at 17 years old and also the club's youngest ever captain at just 21 years old. He captained the club for nearly 10 years and played his entire career with CSKA Moscow.

Shesternyov featured in the European Championships - UEFA Teams of Tournament twice and was the Soviet Footballer of the Year in 1970, he was also voted 3rd in 1966, 1968 & 1969.

After leading CSKA to their first national title in 19 years he chose to retire from football on a high at only 30.

He was voted, by Ballon d'Or, the 14th, 11th, 10th and then 22nd best footballer in the world in 1968, 1969, 1970 and 1971 respectively. During these years he was regarded as one of the best defenders in the world and if he had chosen to join one of the many European big teams that were chasing him, many said he would have been even more so highly regarded in the footballing world. He was, however, always commended for his one-club career.

He was recently voted into the Soviet Union all-time World Cup team by football media website PlanetWorldCup.

In 1970, he became the Soviet Footballer of the Year.

Honours

CSKA Moscow
 USSR Championship: 1970

Soviet Union
 UEFA European Championship runner-up: 1964

Individual
UEFA Euro Team of the Tournament: 1968
 Soviet Footballer of the Year: 1970

Personal life
Shesternyov was married to the Soviet figure skater Tatyana Zhuk. This marriage lasted until 1973. He married again in 1974. Due to depression and alcohol abuse, he died of cirrhosis of the liver in 1994, at the age of 53.

References

External links
  RussiaTeam biography
  UEFA Teams of Tournament
  14th in Ballon d'Or 1968
  11th in Ballon d`Or 1969
  10th in Ballon d`Or 1970
  22nd in Ballon d`Or 1971
  Record of Appearances
  "All time Eleven"
  Soviet Footballer of the Year

1941 births
1994 deaths
Soviet footballers
Soviet Union international footballers
Russian footballers
1962 FIFA World Cup players
1966 FIFA World Cup players
1970 FIFA World Cup players
1964 European Nations' Cup players
UEFA Euro 1968 players
Soviet Top League players
PFC CSKA Moscow players
Footballers from Moscow
Soviet football managers
Russian football managers
PFC CSKA Moscow managers
Association football sweepers